East Side or Eastside may refer to:

Places

Australia 
 East Side, Northern Territory

Canada 
 Eastside, Ontario, a neighborhood in Sault Ste. Marie, Ontario
 Downtown Eastside, Vancouver, British Columbia

United Kingdom 
 Eastside, Birmingham, West Midlands, England
 Eastside, Swansea, Wales

United States  
 East San Jose, California
 Eastside, Long Beach, California
 Eastside Los Angeles, a neighborhood within Los Angeles
 East Side of Stamford, Connecticut
 Eastside, Atlanta, Georgia
 East Side, Chicago, Illinois
 Eastside, Flint, Michigan
 East Side, Kansas City, Missouri
 Eastside, Lexington, Kentucky, a neighborhood in southeastern Lexington
 East Side (Melrose), Massachusetts, a neighborhood
 East Side Township, Mille Lacs County, Minnesota
 Eastside, Paterson, New Jersey
 East Side, Binghamton, New York, a neighborhood of Binghamton
 East Side, Buffalo, New York
 East Side (Manhattan), New York
 Lower East Side, Manhattan, New York
 Upper East Side, Manhattan, New York
 Eastside, Oklahoma City, Oklahoma
 East Side, Pennsylvania
 East Side, Providence, Rhode Island, a collection of neighborhoods
 Eastside (King County, Washington), the eastern suburbs of Seattle, Washington
 The East Side (Milwaukee), Wisconsin

Other uses
 Eastside High School (disambiguation)
 Eastside, part of St. David's Centre shopping centre, Cardiff, Wales
 "East Side", a 2000 song by Canadian pop group Smoother
 "Eastside" (song), a 2018 song by Benny Blanco, Halsey, and Khalid
 Eastside (film), a 1999 American film directed by Lorena David

See also
 East Side/West Side, a 1963 TV show